Date and time notation in the United Kingdom records the date using the day–month–year format (31 December 1999, 31/12/99 or 31/12/1999). The ISO 8601 format (1999-12-31) is increasingly used for all-numeric dates. The time can be written using either the 24-hour clock (23:59) or the 12-hour clock (11:59 pm).

Date

Date notation in English
Dates are traditionally and most commonly written in day–month–year (DMY) order:

 31 December 1999
 31/12/99

Formal style manuals discourage writing the day of the month as an ordinal number (for example "31st December"), except with an incomplete reference, such as "They set off on 12 August 1960 and arrived on the 18th".

When saying the date, it is usually pronounced using "the", then the ordinal number of the day first, then the preposition "of", then the month (for example "the thirty-first of December"). The month-first form (for example "December the third") was widespread until the mid-20th century and remains the most common format for newspapers across the United Kingdom. Example: The Times and the British tabloids (Daily Mail, Daily Mirror, The Sun, Daily Express) all have 'Friday, December 31 2021', while The Guardian, the Financial Times and The Daily Telegraph all have 'Friday 31 December 2021'. Consequently in the UK there is no standard pattern for long form dates when printed, as opposed to when using numeric dates, for which there are standard formats.

The month-first format is still spoken, perhaps more commonly when not including a year in the sentence. When the date is written out in full, or when spoken, usage can be one or the other. Neither is distinctly preferred over the other, and there is no risk of ambiguity.

All-numeric dates
All-numeric dates are used in notes and references, but not running prose. They can be written in several forms. For example, to represent 31 December 1999:

 31/12/99 or 31.12.99
 31.xii.99 (unusual)
 1999-12-31 (unusual except when required for sorting purposes)

The year may also be written in full (31/12/1999). It contrasts with date and time notation in the United States, where the month is placed first, leading to confusion in international communications: in the United States, 2/11/03 is interpreted as 11 February 2003. To remedy this, the month is sometimes written in Roman numerals, a format common in some European countries: 2.xi.03.

The ISO 8601 format (adopted as British Standard BS ISO 8601:2004) is unambiguous and machine-readable, and increasingly popular in technical, scientific, financial, and computing contexts. It also has the desirable property that lists of dates in this format, when sorted lexicographically correspond to their chronological order. The Government Digital Service requires it for all forms of data transmission. Dates in this format are separated with hyphens: 2003-11-02.

Weeks
Weeks are generally referred to by the date on which they start, with Monday often treated as the first day of the week, for example "the week commencing 5 March". Some more traditional calendars instead treat Sunday as the first day of the week. ISO 8601 week numbers are found in diaries and are used in business.

Date notation in Welsh
The day–month–year order is also used in modern Welsh:

 

The month–day–year order (for example "") was previously more common: it is usual to see a Welsh month–day–year date next to an English day–month–year date on a bilingual plaque from the latter half of the 20th century.

Time

Time notation in English
Both the 24-hour and 12-hour notations are used in the United Kingdom, for example:

 23:59 or 23.59
 11.59 p.m.

The 24-hour notation is used in timetables and on most digital clocks, but 12-hour notation is still widely used in ordinary life. The 24-hour notation is used more often than in North America – transport timetables use it exclusively, as do most legal documents – but not as commonly as in much of the non-English-speaking world. The BBC has been using 24-hour notation in its online radio and TV guides for many years, though ITV, Channel 4, and Channel 5 still maintain 12-hour notation.

It is rare to use the 24-hour format when speaking; 21:30 is colloquially spoken as "half past nine" or "nine thirty" rather than "twenty-one thirty". The spoken 24-hour format is used in airport and railway station announcements: "We regret to inform that the fifteen hundred [15:00] service from Nottingham is running approximately 10 minutes late"; "The next train arriving at Platform four is the twenty fifteen [20:15] service to London Euston". Like North America but unlike mainland Europe, a leading zero is used for the hour of the 24-hour format, as in 08:30 (read "oh eight thirty").

To separate the hours, minutes and seconds, either a point or a colon can be used. For 12-hour time, the point format (for example "1.45 p.m.") is in common usage and has been recommended by some style guides, including the academic manual published by Oxford University Press under various titles, as well as the internal house style book for the University of Oxford, that of The Guardian and The Times newspapers.

The colon format (as in "1:45 p.m.") is also recognised and is common in digital devices and applications. The more descriptive 2014 revision of New Hart's Rules concedes that the colon format "is often seen in British usage too", and that either style "is acceptable if applied consistently."

The time-of-day abbreviations (which are generally lowercase only) are handled in various conflicting styles, including "a.m." and "p.m." with a space between the time and the abbreviation ("1.45 p.m."); "am" and "pm" with a space ("1.45 pm" – recognised as an alternative usage by Oxford); and the same without a space ("1.45pm" – primarily found in news writing).

In 24-hour time, a colon is internationally standard (as in "13:45"). Some British news publishers favour "13.45" format instead, such as The Guardian.  Some stick with the colon, including the Evening Standard and the BBC. Oxford recognises both styles. The "a.m." and "p.m." abbreviations are not used with 24-hour time in any form.

British colloquialism
In British English, the expression "half [hour]" is used colloquially to denote 30 minutes past the hour. For example, "half ten" means 10:30 (am or pm). This is itself an abbreviation of an older colloquialism, "half past ten". The abbreviation can cause misunderstanding with non-British English speakers as this contrasts with many European languages, where the same type of expression denotes 30 minutes  the hour. For example, Czech půl desáté, German halb zehn, and Finnish puoli kymmenen (all literally "half ten") mean 9:30.

The following table shows times written in some common approaches to 12-hour and 24-hour notation, and how each time is typically spoken:

Time notation in Welsh
The Welsh language usage of the 12-hour and 24-hour clocks is similar to that of UK English above. However, the 24-hour notation has only a written, not a spoken form. For example, written 9:00 and 21:00 (or 09.00, etc.) are said (literally 'nine of the bell').

References

See also 

 Date format by country

Time in the United Kingdom
United Kingdom